The 2022 Arkansas State Treasurer election took place on November 8, 2022, to elect the next Arkansas State Treasurer. Incumbent Republican Party Treasurer Dennis Milligan was term-limited and could not seek a third term. Republican candidate Mark Lowery won the general election, defeating Democrat candidate Pam Whitaker.

Republican primary

Candidates

Declared
Mark Lowery, state representative from the 39th district (2013–)

Eliminated in primary 
Mathew Pitsch, state senator from the 8th district

Endorsements

Polling

Results

Democratic nominee
Pam Whitaker, drone services company CEO

General election

Endorsements

Results

Notes

References

External links
Official campaign websites
Mark Lowery (R) for State Treasurer

State Treasurer
Arkansas